is a single released by Gackt on March 14, 2001, under Nippon Crown. It peaked at sixth place on the Oricon weekly chart and charted for eighteen weeks. It is Gackt's fifth best selling single, with 146,770 copies sold. The title track was later covered as an acoustic track for Gackt's Seventh Night album in 2004.

Track listing

References

2001 singles
Gackt songs
2001 songs
Songs written by Gackt